Phebalium appressum is a species of shrub that is endemic to the southwest of Western Australia. It is more or less covered with silvery scales and has egg-shaped to heart-shaped leaves pressed against the stems, and flowers with rust-coloured scales on the pedicel. It is only known from the type specimen.

Description
The flowers are white and borne singly or in pairs on the ends of branchlets. Flowering occurs in July.

Taxonomy and naming
Phebalium appressum was first formally described in 1998 by Paul Wilson in the journal Nuytsia from a specimen collected north of Coolgardie in 1991.

Distribution and habitat
This phebalium grows on yellow sandplain and is only known from north of Coolgardie.

Conservation status
Phebalium appressum is classified as "Priority One" by the Government of Western Australia Department of Parks and Wildlife, meaning that it is known from only one or a few locations which are potentially at risk.

References

appressum
Flora of Western Australia
Plants described in 1998
Taxa named by Paul G. Wilson